Alester Maregwede (born 5 August 1981) is a Zimbabwean cricketer. He is a wicket-keeper and middle-order batsman. He has represented the Zimbabwe A team as vice captain.

He made his first appearances on a West Indies tour in 2003-04 and, since the departure of many Zimbabwean team members, he has found himself playing on a regular basis. He has also represented the Midlands team in the Logan Cup.

Maregwede was born and raised in the Harare suburb of Highfield and first played cricket at Chipembere Primary School. When he was 11 he played his first "proper" match, for Highfield against a High Glen Select XI and he was given the wicketkeeper's gloves for no reason other than that there was no one else to do it. He batted seven, top scoring with 42. Later he was named as captain of Highfield in an inter-suburb tournament which Highfield won. He won a ZCU scholarship to attend Prince Edward School but he ended up at Churchill School because of his need to board.

Whilst he was still in first year he was named captain of a Zimbabwe Development XI for a tour to South Africa. He averaged 64 on the tour and he only lost one game. Because of this tour he started playing for Churchill's full team, as an opener and wicketkeeper. He made his first-class debut for Mashonaland "A" in the Logan Cup versus the full Mashonaland side when he was only 16, scoring 5 and 19.

Maregwede was admitted to the CFX Academy in 2000, missing his final year of school to go. He averaged 41 in the Logan Cup for the academy, with two fifties. Alester has since moved into the full Mashonaland side, with two hundreds and ten fifties.

Maregwede's cricket heroes are Steve Waugh, and like many Zimbabweans, Andy Flower. His proudest moment came in the U19 World Cup when he scored 64 against Australia. He also played first team rugby and hockey for Churchill and was a sprinter. Alester really enjoys travelling, and is glad that his cricket commitments give him the chance to visit many foreign countries. Alester was a vital member of the Mildura Settlers Cricket Clubs first premiership in 20 years. Alester has since parted ways with the club but is hopeful of remaining in the area.

External links

1981 births
Living people
Alumni of Churchill School (Harare)
Zimbabwe One Day International cricketers
Zimbabwe Test cricketers
Zimbabwean cricketers
Masvingo cricketers
Midlands cricketers
CFX Academy cricketers
Wicket-keepers